Anirudhan Sampath (born 22 July 1962) is an Indian politician and was a member of the 16th Lok Sabha of India. He was represented the Attingal constituency of Kerala and is a member of the Communist Party of India (Marxist) (CPI(M)) political party. In 2014 he was elected as M.P. from Attingal for the third time. He is the son of the late Communist party leader and former MP K. Aniruddhan. M.P. Sampath is married and has a daughter, Aswathy Sampath. He is related to the Communist Party Leader A.K. Gopalan. In 2019 Indian general election, he lost to Adoor Prakash.

References

External links

 Official biographical sketch in Parliament of India website

1963 births
Living people
Communist Party of India (Marxist) politicians from Kerala
India MPs 2009–2014
Politicians from Thiruvananthapuram
Lok Sabha members from Kerala
India MPs 1996–1997
India MPs 2014–2019
Government Law College, Thiruvananthapuram alumni